"Get-A-Way" is a song by German Eurodance project Maxx, released in October 1993 as the debut single from the project's first album, To the Maxximum (1994). In Germany, it reached Gold status for selling over 250,000 units. It peaked within the top 10 in at least 13 countries; Austria, Belgium, the Czech Republic, Denmark, Finland, Ireland, Japan, the Netherlands, Norway, Scotland, Sweden, Switzerland and the United Kingdom. By mid-1994, it sold over 1.1 million singles in Europe.

Background
"Get-A-Way" originally featured vocals by rapper Boris Köhler (Gary Bokoe) and singer Samira Besic. It was inspired by Ice MC's "Take Away the Colour" and became a major club hit in Germany upon release in October 1993. For unknown reasons, Besic did not participate further in Maxx beyond recording vocals for "Get-A-Way." A model-dancer named Eliz Yavuz (Alice Montana) was hired to lip-sync Besic's vocals for the accompanying music video. British singer Linda Meek was later recruited into the act early in 1994. She quickly became associated with "Get-A-Way," by the media due to her regularly performing the song live in concert and on music television programs with Köhler for music programs like Top of the Pops, Dance Machine, MTV and many more.

Critical reception
American magazine Billboard complimented the song as "quality dancefloor music", noting "its creative mixture of reggae, rap and speed muffin." James Masterton stated in his weekly UK chart commentary, "This record could hardly miss, being a proven formula. Just like Apache Indian's "Boom-Shack-A-Lack" and Shaggy's "Oh Carolina" before it, "Get-A-Way" is a frenetic ragga track, enough to wear out even the most hardened dancer yet commercial enough for radio to love it to death." Pan-European magazine Music & Media wrote that "this steaming houser has it all: a thumping beat that should get the crippled going, pulsating synthesizers that provide both the slightly ambient melody and the background, and a prominent rap to put the icing on the cake. It definitely has huge international chart potential." James Hamilton from Music Weeks RM Dance Update described the song as a "ragga 'white man' and raucous girl chanted cheesy" 2 Unlimited-like galloper.

Chart performance
"Get-A-Way" became a huge dancefloor hit in Europe, peaking at number eleven in Germany, and within the top 5 in Austria, the Czech Republic, Denmark, Finland, the Netherlands, Sweden and the UK. In the latter, it peaked at number four in its third week at the UK Singles Chart, on May 29, 1994. It stayed at that position for two weeks. On the UK Dance Singles Chart, it reached number five. The single also became a top 10 hit in Belgium (Flanders), Ireland, Norway, Scotland and Switzerland, as well as on the Eurochart Hot 100, where it reached number ten. "Get-A-Way" was later certified with a gold record in Germany for selling over 450,000 units and a silver record in the UK for selling over 200,000. By mid-1994, the single reached a total of 1.1 million in European commercial sales. Outside Europe, it was a top 10 hit in Japan and on the RPM Dance/Urban chart in Canada, where it peaked at number three. In Israel, it was a top 20 hit, peaking at number eleven, while it only reached number 196 in Australia.

Music video
The accompanying music video for "Get-A-Way" was directed by Jonathan Bate. It was filmed in Sweden. The video was later published on Altra Moda Music's official YouTube channel in July 2016 and had generated more than 75 million views as of December 2022. Bate would also go on directing the video for the project's next single, "No More (I Can't Stand It)".

The video begins with a man at a cemetery. On a grave he lays down a piece of jewelry and leaves. Then another scene begins in a parking garage, with several men wearing gas masks, raiding a Securitas van and escaping. A detective, the man from the cemetery, appears on the scene. Afterwards a young woman is seen fleeing with two suitcases. She loses a piece of jewelry when she is picked up by a man in a white car, apparently her lover who has been involved in the robbery. The detective finds the piece of jewelry lying on the ground, picks it up and starts chasing the couple. They drives through a winter landscape and visits a petrol station before they arrives a caravan in the forest. They kiss each other and run into the woods. The detective has been on the petrol station and through the forest he has come to the caravan. Right afterwards, the couple returns from the trip in the woods and enters the caravan, unaware that they have been found. Through the video, Gary Bokoe is seen rapping at the scene in the parking garage, surrounded by flashing police lights, police officers and barrier tape around him. Alice Montana performs the chorus as she walks through the cemetery. Other scenes shows her sitting in the back seat of a car.

Track listings

 CD maxi-single (Europe, 1993) "Get-A-Way" (Airplay Mix) - 3:45
 "Get-A-Way" (Club Mix) - 5:35
 "Get-A-Way" (Twilight Mix) - 5:33
 "Get-A-Way" (Get In Trance Mix) - 4:49

 CD maxi-single  - Remix (Europe, 1994)'
 "Get-A-Way" (2AM Club Mix) - 5:21
 "Get-A-Way" (Piano Remix) - 4:59
 "Get-A-Way" (Naked Eye Radio Mix) - 4:01

Charts

Weekly charts

Year-end charts

Certifications

References

 

1993 debut singles
1993 songs
Blow Up singles
English-language German songs
Maxx songs
Songs written by Jürgen Wind
Music videos directed by Jonathan Bate